Mojca Drčar Murko (born 2 July 1942 in Ljubljana) is a Slovenian politician and a former Member of the European Parliament. She is a member of Liberal Democracy of Slovenia, which is part of the Alliance of Liberals and Democrats for Europe, and sits on the European Parliament's Committee on the Environment, Public Health and Food Safety.

She is also a substitute for the Committee on Regional Development, a member of the delegation to the EU–Macedonia Joint Parliamentary Committee, a substitute for the delegation to the EU–Croatia Joint Parliamentary Committee, and a substitute for the delegation to the Euro-Mediterranean Parliamentary Assembly.

Education
 1965: Law degree from the University of Ljubljana
 1973: Master's degree in public and civil law from the University of Zagreb

Career
 Foreign correspondent for Delo newspaper (1978-1982 in Bonn, 1989–1993 in Rome and 1997–2004 in Vienna)
 1974-1976: Chairwoman of the tribunal of the Journalists' Association of Slovenia

External links
 Official website
 
 

1942 births
Living people
Liberal Democracy of Slovenia MEPs
MEPs for Slovenia 2004–2009
Women MEPs for Slovenia
Politicians from Ljubljana
University of Ljubljana alumni
Faculty of Law, University of Zagreb alumni
Journalists from Ljubljana
Slovenian women journalists